Marcy Wheeler (known on Twitter by the handle "emptywheel") is an American independent journalist specializing in national security and civil liberties. Wheeler publishes on her own site, Emptywheel, established in July 2011. She has reported on United States v. Libby (the trial of I. Lewis "Scooter" Libby) and the investigation of President Donald Trump's possible connections to Russia, among other national security matters.

Early life
Wheeler grew up with parents who worked for IBM. Wheeler graduated with a BA from Amherst College in 1990. With an interest in the way businesses use language, Wheeler spent the next five years in corporate consulting, specifically teaching employees to compose large documents. She moved to Ann Arbor, Michigan from her native New York City for graduate school in 1995. In 2000, she earned a Ph.D in comparative literature from the University of Michigan, writing her dissertation on the feuilleton, a literary-journalistic essay form that is often self-published. In her online "Prologue" to Anatomy of Deceit, she observes that the feuilleton essay is an important medium for expressing opinions which might ordinarily be censored due to government displeasure, citing recent examples such as former Czechoslovakian dissident and former Czech President Václav Havel.

Career 
Wheeler makes occasional contributions to the commentary and analysis section of The Guardian,  Daily Kos, The Huffington Post, Democracy Now!, and Michigan Liberal. Between early December 2007 and July 2011 Wheeler published primarily on Jane Hamsher's FireDogLake (FDL) and prior to that on The Next Hurrah. Many of Wheeler's 2007 blog entries at The Next Hurrah focused on the Congressional hearings into the dismissal of eight U.S. attorneys subsequent to the November 2006 U.S. midterm election.

During United States v. Libby, the trial of I. Lewis "Scooter" Libby, Wheeler reported on the testimony as one of the few press-accredited bloggers allowed in the courtroom. In her account, she describes her entries as "not a transcript"; nevertheless, such bloggers' eye-witness accounts served as sources of reliable information about the trial for readers. In his column/blog White House Watch, published in washingtonpost.com, Dan Froomkin cited the efforts of FiredogLake in live-blogging the Libby trial as "essential reading" (page 3). During the trial, she appeared on camera in video reports posted online on PoliticsTV.com, along with other accredited Libby trial blogger-correspondents such as TalkLeft creator Jeralyn Merritt and FDL creator Jane Hamsher and FDL principal blogger Christy Hardin Smith.

Wheeler held an unpaid, part-time position as "Senior Policy Analyst" at The Intercept for several months after its February 2014 launch. She has described that period as a "chaotic time," and said that working there "was a pain in the ass." In particular, she came into conflict with editor-in-chief John Cook, who refused to pay for her work and expertise, was reluctant to publish what she believed was an important surveillance story, and excluded her from the first meeting of all staff reporters—which she construed as Cook's opinion that she was not a worthy journalist. Consequently, she resigned.

Wheeler became a witness in Special Counsel Robert Mueller's investigation of President Donald Trump's possible connections to Russia after outing one of her sources to the FBI in 2017. Wheeler stated that she had "concrete evidence he was lying to [her]" and that her source was "doing serious harm to innocent people".

She campaigned for Democratic presidential candidate Howard Dean in 2004, and is a former vice chairwoman of the Washtenaw County Democratic Party.

Anatomy of Deceit
Wheeler's reputation as a blogger stems from her analysis of the outing of the covert CIA identity of Valerie E. Wilson, also known as Valerie Plame, and the Bush administration's justification for 2003 invasion of Iraq and the Iraq War.  Several of her posts led to follow-up stories in the mainstream media.  As their first book publication by FDL Books (Vaster Books), "in order to have Marcy [Wheeler]’s work seen by a larger audience," FireDogLake and Daily Kos jointly published her book on the CIA leak scandal, entitled Anatomy of Deceit: How the Bush Administration Used the Media to Sell the Iraq War and Out a Spy, on January 28, 2007.

Related media articles and interviews

Due to her extensive research about the outing of Valerie Plame and her coverage of the Libby trial as a blogger, Wheeler was a guest on NPR's Talk of the Nation. Wheeler was interviewed by online media outlets such as The Raw Story; Amy Goodman interviewed her along with Murray Waas on the radio program Democracy Now! and she was also a special guest at the Daily Kos "YearlyKos Convention" fundraiser in New York City, on March 10, 2007.

Awards 
Wheeler received a 2009 Sidney Hillman Foundation Journalism Award, in the blog category, cited for her body of work, including 2009 coverage of the auto industry crisis, and the evolution of G.W. Bush administration justification and practice of torture (so-called "Enhanced Interrogation Techniques").

Personal life
Wheeler is married to an engineer. As of 2022 she is living in Ireland.

Bibliography

Notes

External links

Emptywheel blog.
"Archive for the 'Blogs - Blogger Profiles' Category".  PoliticsTV.com – Inc. video clips of Marcy Wheeler, et al., during the trial of I. Lewis "Scooter" Libby, in United States v. Libby.
Contributors Index: "empty wheel" (Marcy Wheeler) at The Next Hurrah (blog).
Collection of Marcy Wheeler's commentary on Democracy Now!

Living people
American bloggers
Writers from Ann Arbor, Michigan
Writers from Grand Rapids, Michigan
University of Michigan alumni
Amherst College alumni
Michigan Democrats
Year of birth missing (living people)